Louis-Édouard Glackmeyer (December 7, 1793 – February 9, 1881) was a Canadian notary, flautist, and municipal councilor. 

Glackmeyer was a member of the Quebec City Council from 1833 to 1845 (St. Charles Ward) and from 1854 to 1856 (St. Pierre Ward).

Glackmeyer was also an accomplished flautist.

Personal 
He was a son of Frederick Glackmeyer, a German-born music educator, and MarieAnne O'Neil.

References

1793 births
1881 deaths
Canadian notaries
Quebec City councillors
Canadian flautists